Barpali railway station is a railway station on the East Coast Railway network in the state of Odisha, India. It serves Barpali town. Its code is BRPL. It has two platforms. Passenger, Express and Superfast trains halt at Barpali railway station.

Major trains

 Dhanbad–Alappuzha Express
 Sambalpur–Rayagada Intercity Express
 Tapaswini Express
 Samaleshwari Express
 Puri–Durg Express
 Ispat Express
 Rourkela–Jagdalpur Express
 Bhubaneswar–Bolangir Intercity Superfast Express

See also
 Bargarh district

References

Railway stations in Bargarh district
Sambalpur railway division